Fabrizio Della Fiori (born 1 September 1951) is a retired professional basketball player from Italy. He was inducted into the Italian Basketball Hall of Fame, in 2014.

Professional career
Della Fiori was a member of the FIBA European Selection, in 1977 and 1980.

Italian national team
Della Fiori won the silver medal with the senior Italian national basketball team, at the 1980 Summer Olympics, in Moscow. His team lost in the final, against Yugoslavia. Previously, he won a bronze medal at the 1975 EuroBasket, and finished fourth at the 1977 EuroBasket.

References

External links
 FIBA Profile
 FIBA Europe Profile
 Italian League Profile 
 
 
 

1951 births
Living people
Basketball players at the 1976 Summer Olympics
Basketball players at the 1980 Summer Olympics
Italian men's basketball players
1978 FIBA World Championship players
Olympic basketball players of Italy
Olympic medalists in basketball
Olympic silver medalists for Italy
Reyer Venezia players
Medalists at the 1980 Summer Olympics
Pallacanestro Cantù players
Pallacanestro Varese players
Power forwards (basketball)